Kim Thành is a rural district of Hải Dương province in the Red River Delta region of Vietnam. As of 2003 the district had a population of 125,633. The district capital lies at Phú Thái.

References

Districts of Hải Dương province